Morecambe Poulton Lane  was the original terminus station of the London and North Western Railway's branch to Morecambe, Lancaster, Lancashire, England. The line remains open between Morecambe and Lancaster, however nothing remains of the station.

References

Disused railway stations in Lancaster
Former London and North Western Railway stations
Buildings and structures in Morecambe
Railway stations in Great Britain opened in 1864
Railway stations in Great Britain closed in 1886